Creatures from the Abyss (original title Plankton) is a 1994 Italian b-movie directed by Al Passeri and written by Richard Bauman. The film starred Clay Rogers, Michael Bon, Sharon Twomey, Laura di Palma, Ann Wolf, and movie director and actor Deran Sarafian.

Synopsis
A group of five teenagers, three girls, and two boys get lost in the ocean with a Dinghy, and a big storm begins. Suddenly they spot a yacht sitting in the middle of the ocean, and they go to investigate and to find shelter. But in fact, the yacht was a secret laboratory studying mutated fish results of radioactive plankton. One of the specimens escapes kills the whole crew, and preys on the unsuspecting teenagers.

Cast
 Clay Rogers as Mike
 Michael Bon as Bobby
 Sharon Twomey as Margareth
 Laura di Palma as Dorothy
 Ann Wolf as Julie
 Deran Sarafian as Professor Clark

Release
Shriek Studio released Creatures from the Abyss on 31 July 2007 as part of the Mutant Monsters Triple Feature along with The Dark and The Being.

Reception
Much of the coverage for Creatures from the Abyss focused on the film's production values, acting, and dubbing. HorrorNews.net noted that the film contained poor dubbing, special effects, and acting while also stating "Is this movie worth your time? I’d have to say “Yes!” Is it a new cult classic in the making? Maybe. Don’t really see people flinging caviar at the screen. Still, it is quite quotable, and makes for a great party film with like-minded friends." Clive Davies noted many of the same issues with the film in his book Spinegrinder, however wrote that the stop motion effects were "quite good".

Bleeding Skull called the film a ripoff of Piranha, further writing that the film "looks like it was shot by the team behind Friday the 13th Part VIII: Jason Takes Manhattan and feels like it was written by Lloyd Kaufman between The Toxic Avenger and Class of Nuke 'Em High.

References

External links
 Creatures from the Abyss at the Internet Movie Database
 Creatures from the Abyss on Rotten Tomatoes
 Creatures from the Abyss at AllMovie

1994 films
1994 horror films
1990s monster movies
1990s Italian-language films
Films shot in Florida
Natural horror films
Italian horror films
1990s Italian films